Annie Philomena Lee (born 24 March 1933) is an Irish woman whose life was chronicled in the 2009 book The Lost Child of Philomena Lee by Martin Sixsmith. The book was made into a film titled  Philomena (2013), which was nominated for four Academy Awards, including Best Actress for Judi Dench's portrayal of Philomena, and Best Picture. 

Lee is now an advocate and spokesperson for adoption rights. Lee has created The Philomena Project in order to raise awareness about adoption laws and find ways to improve them. In February 2014, she met  Pope Francis to discuss adoption policies.

Personal life
Lee was born Annie Philomena Lee in County Limerick, Ireland in 1933. Her mother died of tuberculosis when Lee was six. Her father, a butcher, sent Lee and her sisters, Kaye and Mary, to a convent school and kept his sons at home. After Lee completed her formal education at the convent, she went to live with her maternal aunt, Kitty Madden.

She married in 1959, had two more children, Jane and Kevin, and worked as a nurse. She divorced her first husband and later remarried.

Pregnancy
When she was 18, Philomena became pregnant by a man named John, who worked for the post office. She was then sent to the Sean Ross Abbey in Roscrea, a place for unwed mothers. After giving birth to a son, Philomena worked unpaid at the Abbey, where she was forced to stay until she was 22, at which time the Abbey sold her 3-year-old son to be adopted by a Catholic family in the United States. 

This was done without Philomena’s consent and against her wishes. At the time in Ireland, such treatment of unwed mothers was common practice. After forcing Philomena to sign the adoption papers, the nuns involved refused to disclose any details regarding her son’s fate, except that he was taken to the US. After she left the Abbey, Philomena moved to England and studied to become a nurse.

Book
Around Christmas, in 2003, Lee revealed to her family that she had given birth to a son when she was 19, and she did not know his whereabouts. For decades, she had secretly been trying to find out what had happened to her son, without success. Her daughter, Jane, decided to approach journalist Martin Sixsmith at a New Year's Eve Party a few weeks later. She explained Philomena's story and asked Sixsmith whether he would be interested in helping them find out what had happened to the child.

Sixsmith agreed to take on the story. He and Philomena spent years researching, until they discovered her son had been adopted by an American couple, Doc and Marge Hess, who named the child Michael Hess. The Hess family also adopted a little girl named Mary from the Abbey; Mary and Michael grew up together as siblings. Sixsmith and Philomena eventually came to learn that Michael died (of AIDS) in 1995, and that for years he had tried, without success, to find his birth mother. Before his death he arranged to be buried at the Sean Ross Abbey, in the hope that his mother might someday find his grave, which she eventually did.

Film
A script was developed by Jeff Pope and Steve Coogan based on Sixsmith's book. Stephen Frears directed with Judi Dench cast as Philomena. The film was distributed by The Weinstein Company in November 2013 and was nominated for four Academy Awards, including Best Picture, Best Actress, Best Adapted Screenplay, and Best Original Score.

References

External links
 

1933 births
20th-century Irish women
21st-century Irish women
Irish expatriates in England
Irish nurses
Irish women activists
Living people
People from Newcastle West
Roscrea